Rolla is an Italian surname and also a diminutive for the Toyota Corolla.

Rolla may refer to:

People

Surname
Alessandro Rolla (1757–1841), Italian composer, violin and viola virtuoso
Antonio Rolla (1798–1837), Italian composer, violin and viola virtuoso

Given name
Rolla Anderson (born 1920), American former football and basketball player and coach
Rolla Daringer (1888–1974), American baseball shortstop 
Rolla Dyer (1886–1971), American physician
Rolla Mapel (1890–1966), American baseball pitcher
Rolla C. McMillen (1880–1961), American politician from Illinois
Rolla Norman (1889–1971), French actor
Rolla Wells (1856–1944), American politician from Missouri

Places
United States
Rolla, Kansas
Rolla, Missouri
Missouri University of Science and Technology, formerly the University of Missouri–Rolla
Rolla, North Dakota

Canada
Rolla, British Columbia

Norway
Rolla (Troms), an island in Troms county, in the municipality of Ibestad

United Arab Emirates
Rolla, an area within Sharjah (emirate)

India
Rolla, Anantapur, a village and mandal in Andhra Pradesh

Other uses
Rolla (ship), name of multiple ships
"Rolla", a poem by Alfred de Musset
Rolla, a painting by Henri Gervex

See also
Rolla Township (disambiguation)
Rollo (disambiguation)

Italian-language surnames